Tyger Valley College, also known as TVC is a private  English medium, combined, co-educational  situated in the suburb of Silver Lakes in the East of Tshwane in the Gauteng province of South Africa. Competing annually in the Sim-Farrer (points based tournament including all winter sports) cup with sister school Pecanwood College, TVC has been found lacking in sporting ability against their smaller and less equipped sister school. Winning the cup on only two occasions (in one occasion with a barbarian rugby team formed of English schoolboys). 
Founded in 2007 by Centurus Colleges, the education subsidiary of Centurus (Pty) Ltd.  It follows a co-ordinate educational model within a village of schools consisting of a pre-preparatory, preparatory, and college.

TVC offers education to children from the age of three (in Grade 000) to age eighteen (in Grade 12). TVC has achieved 100% matric pass rate since the first matrics wrote exams in 2011.

Matric pupils write the Independent Education Board's (IEB) school leaving certificate.

TVC follows the South African National Curriculum Statement (NCS) and is registered with the Gauteng Department of Education (GED). The teachers of TVC are affiliated to the South African Council of Educators (SACE).

History 

Centurus Colleges, the education subsidiary of Centurus (Pty) Ltd, opened its first school Pecanwood College in 2005. This was followed by Southdowns College in 2007 and Tyger Valley College the same year.

The College was opened on 15 January 2007, by the founding principal Mr G Sim. The College opened with 62 students, 10 teachers, 1 administrator and 2 general assistants, from Grade 000 to Grade 6. During the first term of 2007, TVC never had school uniform because of an administrative oversight from Head Office – it had been designed and approved but not ordered. The first year ended with 89 pupils.

The swimming pool was built in 2007, initially the school would shuttle pupils in the kombi bus to Mr and Mrs Papas' pool for swimming. Tennis was played at Mr and Mrs Van Achtenberg's house till the school tennis courts were finished in March 2007.

In 2008 the school opened with 182 pupils in January and included grades from Grade 7 to  Grade 9. The school added a grade each year until 2011 when it had expanded to include all the grades from Grade 000 to Grade 12. By 2016 the school had grown to 1038 pupils.

Until 2009, the entire school was housed within the Pioneer campus, in 2008 the first phase of the Explorer campus was built and occupied in January 2009. The staff accommodation, maintenance shed and performing arts buildings were also completed in 2009. The second half of the Explorer campus was built in 2010 for occupation in 2011, this included the Explorer Fields, which included floodlit tennis courts and nets. The first Phase of the Discovery campus, the Discovery fields and the school Hall were built in 2012 for occupation in 2013. The second phase of the Discovery block was completed in 2014 for occupation in 2015. In 2016 work began on a learn to swim, indoor swimming pool built for the Pre-Preparatory school. The learn to swim program is known as the TVC Orcas Swim School.

On the 16th September 2014 the ADvTech group announced that they had procured Centurus Colleges, along with Pecanwood College, Southdowns College and Tyger Valley College for R712 million. The group announced that, "Centurus Colleges will continue to operate as an independent brand within the ADvTECH stable, with each retaining its unique character." The general manager of Centurus Colleges within the ADvTECH group is Christo De Wit.

Pre-Preparatory 
The Pre-Preparatory school, located on the Pioneer campus, caters for boys and girls from three years of age (Grade 000) to seven years of age (Grade 0), after which they move to the Preparatory School. The current headmistress is Mrs C. Weir.

Headmasters since 2007 
 Mr G. Sim (2007-2016)
 Mr G. Langley (2009-)
 Mrs C. Weir (2012-)

Preparatory 
The Preparatory school, located on the Explorer campus, is divided into two sections: Junior Preparatory from Grade 1 to 3 and Senior Preparatory Grade 4 to 6. The current headmaster is Mr G. Langley

Headmasters since 2007 
 Mr G. Sim (2007-2009)
 Mr G. Langley (2009-)

College 
The College, located on the Discovery campus, is divided into two phases: General Education and Training (GET) from Grade 7 to 9 and Further Education and Training (FET) from Grade 10 to 12. The current headmaster of the College is Mr Clyde MacDonald.

Headmasters since 2007 
 Mr G. Sim (2007-2016)
 Mr C. MacDonald (2016-)

Matric pupils 

Tyger Valley College, is the only Centurus College to have achieved 100% matric pass rate since the first matrics wrote exams in 2011. Tyger Valley College has a Prefect Body.

The General Education and Training phase 
The following subjects are made available
 English (Home Language)
 Afrikaans (First Additional Language)
 Mathematics
 Natural Science (Science & Biology)
 Social Science (History & Geography)
 Arts and Culture (Art & Music)
 Technology
 Life Orientation
 Economic Management Sciences (Accounting & Business Studies)
 Computer Literacy

Natural Science as a learning area comprises Science and Biology.  Economic Management Sciences as a learning area comprises Accounting and Business Studies.  Social Sciences comprises Geography and History.

Assessment will take place in many forms throughout the year, but can be divided into two
main groups: Continuous Assessment (Portfolio work) and Summative Assessment (Exams).

The Further Education and Training phase 
The following subjects are made available:

Compulsory subjects (Core) 
 English (Home Language)
 Afrikaans (First Additional Language)
 Life Orientation
 A choice between Mathematics and Mathematical Literacy

Elective Subjects 
Three subjects must be selected to complete the list of subjects for the year. A subject must be selected from each elective grouping

School

School song 

The official school song, Through the vision of our pioneers, was written and composed by Andrea Mitas, the music teacher of the school at the time. Gary Sim and Gavin Langley made some slight changes to the song.

Through the vision of our pioneersThrough their dreams we can achieveAnchored in our pillars of excellenceTyger Valley stands today

Sports, academics, arts and environmentThese are the spheres we hold true and dearTyger Valley we salute you
Proudly and victoriously
Building rich and happy mem’riesTruly through diversityTo God and country for our schoolThrough enjoyment to excellence

Heraldry 

The school badge was designed by Chris Lee - the director of Infinite Learning Solutions (the predecessor of Centurus Colleges). The school badge has two components: a gold bird of prey and behind it a green shield. The colour gold, is associated with illumination, love, compassion, courage, passion. The depiction of a bird of prey represents the possibility of flying high and strength, this is enhanced by their motto "Through Enjoyment to Excellence". The green badge is a symbol of Tyger Valley College's pledge to the environment.

Tradition 

The Polar Bear Swim began as a high school social and is now a tradition. At 22:30 in the evening in June each year college pupils swim the length of the swimming pool. The swimmer and their time is noted and after completing a swim for 3 years the pupil is eligible for a badge which may be worn on their blazer.

House system 
Tyger Valley College has a house system. Each house competes against each other in Inter-house events.

In 2007 Centurus sponsored  one of Holgate's Land Rovers on his Expedition “Africa the Outside Edge”. Mr Holgate visited TVC and in August 2007, two pupils and the Headmaster Gary Sim accompanied him for a week through Ghana. The school then decided that the Houses would be named after great explorers as education is about exploring. There are currently four houses:

 Holgate (Green)
 Livingstone (Blue)
 Rhodes (Red)
 Stanley (Yellow)

In the high school Prefects are used to lead the house, while in the preparatory house captains are selected.

Academics 
The college writes the Independent Examinations Board exams. The school follows a three term system per-year with a mid term break each term. The academic year begins in January and ends in November/December.

Awards 
Tyger Valley College recognizes excellence in: Culture, Sport and Academics.

Cultural Awards 
Half Colours and Full Colours are awarded on merit, considering performance in internationally recognised external exam bodies’ examinations (e.g. Trinity Guildhall, ABRSM etc.) as well as participation in school activities Eisteddfods and festivals.

Sport Awards 
Half Colours and Full Colours are awarded on merit, the specific criteria required for each sport is outlined within the sport policy. Candidates are required to apply for colours should they feel they have met all the criteria in their sport.

Academic Awards 
Tyger Valley College rewards scholars of excellence in three ways: Certificate of Merit, Half Colours and Full Colours.

Colours are limited to Grade 10 to 12 and are awarded regardless of academic performance in previous years. The criteria is represented below.

Honours 
Honours are the highest award one can achieve at the college. To be eligible for the Honours award a student must have been awarded Full Colours three times in a minimum of two areas, with one of the areas being academics.

T.I.M.E 
The Tyger Valley Institute of Mathematical Excellence (TIME), is under the leadership of Mrs Kim Masson. The institute trains staff in the latest development and trends in Mathematics. The institute offers extra Maths Tuition to all children not just those that attend TVC. The vision of TIME is to use experts in Mathematics to work in conjunction with the school's Mathematics department to ensure all pupils from Grade 000 through to Grade 12 are offered every opportunity to excel in Mathematics.

Orcas  
Tyger Valley College, introduced the Orcas program in 2016, which teaches swimming lessons and water safety to the Pre-Preparatory children.

A.E.C 
The Academic Enrichment Centre (AEC) exists to provide support that facilitates independent learning and assist children with emotional, behavioral and social development. The A.E.C monitors the learning of students and provides intervention when required. This ensures that children are equipped with the tools needed to advance in the later grades. The A.E.C also teaches learners skills not often taught in the classroom, such as study methods and test taking skills.

The centre provides the following support:

Psychological well-being (emotional, behavioral, mental and social)
Learning support and remediation to individuals and small groups
Occupational therapy
Speech therapy

The current A.E.C team members are:

Christelle Huddle: Educational Psychologist
Lindy Calmeyer: Learning Support Educator
Mariette Oppermann: Speech Therapist
Christine Glen-Spyron: Occupational Therapist
Dalene Joubert: Occupational Therapist

Outreach 
TVC takes part in a number of outreach programs each year. Each phase of the school partakes with the following goals in mind:
 Reaching out to those less fortunate
 Interaction and Awareness
 Upliftment of the surrounding Community
Traditionally in the spirit of Mandela Day the Preparatory school hosts a fun day for Boschkop Primary School. The fun day includes donations to Boschkop Primary as well as a fun day of activities shared by both the Bosckop Primary School children as well as the Preparatory children.

The college too, has a number of outreach programs that they traditionally partake in which include:
 Four blood drives a year
 Bi-annual feeding scheme for the less fortunate
 Santa Shoe-box for the less fortunate
 Winter warmer handouts

External links 
 Tyger Valley College official site

References 

Nondenominational Christian schools in South Africa
Private schools in Gauteng
Schools in Pretoria
Educational institutions established in 2007
2007 establishments in South Africa